The 2020 Asia & Oceania Boxing Olympic Qualification Tournament for boxing at the 2020 Summer Olympics in Tokyo, Japan, were held from 3 to 11 March 2020 at the Prince Hamzah Sport Hall in Amman, Jordan.

The tournament was originally scheduled to be held in Wuhan, China from February 3–14, 2020 but was cancelled by local organizers amidst concerns over the COVID-19 pandemic, believed to have originated from the city. The qualifiers were moved to Jordan.

Medalists

Men

Women

Qualification summary

Results

Men

Flyweight (52 kg)
Seeds

Featherweight (57 kg)
Seeds

Lightweight (63 kg)
Seeds

Welterweight (69 kg)
Seeds

Middleweight (75 kg)
Seeds

Light heavyweight (81 kg)
Seeds

Heavyweight (91 kg)
Seeds

Super heavyweight (+91 kg)
Seeds

Women

Flyweight (51 kg)
Seeds

Featherweight (57 kg)
Seeds

Lightweight (60 kg)
Seeds

Welterweight (69 kg)
Seeds

Middleweight (75 kg)
Seeds

References

Asia and Oceania Boxing Olympic Qualification Tournament
Asia and Oceania Boxing Olympic Qualification Tournament
International boxing competitions hosted by Jordan
Asia and Oceania Boxing Olympic Qualification Tournament
Asia and Oceania Boxing Olympic Qualification Tournament
Asia and Oceania Boxing Olympic Qualification Tournament, 2020